Václav Vašíček (born 10 February 1991) is a Czech footballer. He plays as a striker, currently for SV Großkrut.

Career
After being Znojmo's top scorer in the 2011–12 Czech 2. Liga, Vašíček re-signed on loan at Znojmo for another six months in August 2012. He joined Dukla on a half-season loan during the winter break of the 2015–16 season.

In the beginning of 2019, Vašíček joined MFK Frýdek-Místek. A half year later, he moved to Austrian club SK Wullersdorf.

Career statistics

References

External links
 
 
 Václav Vašíček at MFK Frýdek-Místek's website
 Václav Vašíček at ÖFB

1991 births
Living people
Czech footballers
Czech expatriate footballers
Czech Republic youth international footballers
Czech National Football League players
Czech First League players
SK Sigma Olomouc players
1. SC Znojmo players
FC Vysočina Jihlava players
FK Dukla Prague players
FK Baník Sokolov players
FK Frýdek-Místek players
Association football forwards
Czech expatriate sportspeople in Austria
Expatriate footballers in Austria
People from Šumperk
Sportspeople from the Olomouc Region